In mathematical analysis, the characteristic variety of a microdifferential operator P is an algebraic variety that is the zero set of the principal symbol of P in the cotangent bundle. It is invariant under a quantized contact transformation.

The notion is also defined more generally in commutative algebra. A basic theorem says a characteristic variety is involutive.

References 
 M. Sato, T. Kawai, and M. Kashiwara: Microfunctions and Pseudo-differential Equations. Lecture note in Math., No. 287, Springer, Berlin-Heidelberg-New York, pp. 265–529 (1973)

Algebraic varieties
Mathematical analysis